The Officers Training Academy Military Band is a musical unit in the Indian Armed Forces based out of Chennai. The OTA Military Band was established in 1973 from an amalgamation of musicians from various regiments in the Indian Army. Since then the band has been involved in boosting the morale and supporting officer cadets during their training at OTA. The band has participated in passing out parades, symphonic concerts, and national military parades. It also performs locally in neighborhoods such as St. Thomas Mount.

The band is composed of three sections: woodwind, brass and percussion. There is also uniquely a piper groups, a resident vocalist and a jazz band. It consists of 34 musicians, many of which are cadets at the OTA. The band's training schedule is composed of 6 hours of training per day for two months prior to a major concert or parade. It is currently led by Subedar Major Afzal Khan.

See also
Indian Army Chief's Band
United States Military Academy Band

References

Military units and formations established in 1973
Musical groups established in 1973
1973 establishments in Tamil Nadu
Indian military bands
Military academy bands